Southgate School is a coeducational secondary school and sixth form located in the Oakwood area of London, England.

The school is situated just east of the Cat Hill roundabout of the A111 and A110, between Cockfosters and Oakwood tube stations. The Trent Park campus of Middlesex University is nearby to the north, on the northern fringe of Greater London's conurbation. Middlesex University has its Cat Hill campus nearby to the east. Although once historically in Southgate, the school is now in the parish of St Thomas, Oakwood, on the boundary with Cockfosters to the west, and on the western edge of Enfield borough, 500 metres east of the Barnet boundary.

History

Grammar school
Founded in 1907 as Southgate County School, the school was originally housed within Broomfield House, Palmers Green.  The school subsequently moved to Fox Lane (also in Palmers Green). In 1960, the Fox Lane site was closed and  a new site, in Sussex Way, Cockfosters, was purchased.

Comprehensive

In 1967 the school merged with Oakwood Secondary Modern School which was located in Chase Road, Southgate. The Chase Road site became the lower school, for children in their first three years of secondary education (currently referred to as years 7, 8 and 9).

The 1990s
In 1991 the Lower School also moved to the Sussex Way site, with the Chase Road site being sold partly for housing and partly to a private school.

The 2000s
In September 2004 the school was awarded Specialist Science Status, which it gained through raising £50,000 and being provided with the necessary funding for a science specialist school. It used the funding to generally improve science facilities purchasing new equipment and renewing laboratories as well as building a hanging laboratory in the middle of the East Wing building (the original Upper School building). 

In the Summer of 2007 Southgate celebrated its centenary.

The 2010s
In 2015, after 15 years as headteacher, Anthony Wilde left Southgate School and was replaced by Martin Lavelle. Lavelle appeared on BBC2 expressing his concern and doubts over the marking of exams.

In April 2016 Southgate School converted from a community school (administered by Enfield London Borough Council) to academy status. The school is now sponsored by the Middlesex Learning Trust.

Football
Southgate has always been very competitive in football having enjoyed remarkable success under the managerial expertise of Mr Lane, Mr Martins and most of all Mr Robinson who is in charge of the sixth form team. 

In 2014 the Southgate sixth form team won the treble, with forward Danilo Orsi-Dadomo becoming Southgate's highest scoring player. 

In 2015, under the captaincy of Alex Ioannou, Southgate retained the Enfield Cup in a sensational final winning 4-3. 

In 2016, following the departure of several key players, Southgate did not win any honours.

Sixth Form Captains
Samuel Taylor 2012-2013
Danilo Orsi-Dadomo 2013-2014
Alex Ioannou 2014-2015
Alfie Deller 2015-2016
Joseph Toscani 2016-2018

Ofsted Report
On 11 February 2009, Southgate was awarded Outstanding Status, one of only two in the London Borough of Enfield.

On 16 October 2019, Southgate School was awarded Good Status; this is the most recent Ofsted inspection.

Notable former pupils

Roy Chipolina, Captain of Gibraltar national football team
Sian Kevill, Journalist, Head of BBC World Service, Editor BBC Newsnight
Kurt Barling, Journalist, Film-maker, author, academic. Professor of Journalism, Middlesex University, Award-winning BBC Special Correspondent BBC London News
Matt Di Angelo, actor and singer best known for his role as Dean Wicks in the BBC soap opera, Eastenders.
Jake Hook, songwriter and producer, 1991 - 1998
Jay1, Rapper, 2008 - 2015
Victoria Shalet, actor, 1993-2000
Phil Tufnell, cricketer
Stephen Twigg, Member of Parliament for Liverpool West Derby

Southgate County Grammar School
 Peter Baker (born 1931), Tottenham Hotspur footballer
 Sir John Bourn, Comptroller and Auditor General 1998–2008
 Alexander Dalgarno, Phillips Professor of Astronomy at Harvard University since 1977 
 Alan Dumayne (1929-1998), historian of north London.
 Leofranc Holford-Strevens (born 1946), classical scholar
 Cecil Hunt, journalist, editor, novelist and anthologist
 Lena Jeger, Baroness Jeger, Labour member of parliament for Holborn and St Pancras South
 George Mitchell, musician 
 Warren Mitchell, actor known for playing Alf Garnett
 Ron Moody, film actor, who played the part of Fagin in the British musical Oliver!
 L. J. K. Setright, motoring journalist

References

External links

 EduBase
 Former school

Secondary schools in the London Borough of Enfield
Educational institutions established in 1907
1907 establishments in England
Academies in the London Borough of Enfield
Southgate, London